Gainesboro is an unincorporated community in Frederick County, Virginia. Gainesboro is located northwest of Winchester off the North Frederick Pike (US 522) on Gainesboro Road (VA 684). Gainesboro is the northernmost community in Virginia.

Gainesboro was established in 1798 and originally known as Pugh Town or Pughtown after an early settler, Job Pugh, who surveyed and plotted the original village.

Historic sites
Gainesboro School (1935), 5629 North Frederick Pike
Gainesboro United Methodist Church

Government
At the national level, Gainesboro is located in Virginia's 10th congressional district, represented by Democrat Jennifer Wexton as of January 3, 2019.

References

External links
Gainesboro Elementary School

Unincorporated communities in Frederick County, Virginia
Unincorporated communities in Virginia